Li Xi (born October 1956) is a Chinese politician who is the current secretary of the Central Commission for Discipline Inspection and the seventh-ranking member of the Politburo Standing Committee of the Chinese Communist Party.

Li spent much of his career in northwestern China, and served as the party secretary of the revolutionary base of Yan'an. He then served as the deputy party secretary of Shanghai, then Governor of Liaoning province, then promoted to party secretary. From 2017 to 2022, he was the Communist Party Secretary of Guangdong province and a member of the 19th Politburo of the Chinese Communist Party.

Early life
Li Xi was born in October 1956 in Liangdang County, Gansu province. He joined the work force in July 1975 and became a member of the Chinese Communist Party (CCP) in January 1982. He graduated from Northwest Normal University.

Political career 
He started his career working as an ordinary functionary in the provincial propaganda department of the Gansu party organization. He worked in multiple positions in Gansu, including Party Secretary of Xigu District of the provincial capital Lanzhou, Deputy Party Secretary of Lanzhou, and Party secretary of Zhangye prefecture.

In 2006, Li became the Party secretary of Yan'an in neighbouring Shaanxi province. Yan'an is of special significance to the Communist Party as it is the site of Mao's revolutionary base after the end of the Long March. In 2011, he was transferred to Shanghai to serve as the Director of the municipality's Organization Department, and later Deputy Party secretary. On May 5, 2014, he was transferred again to Liaoning province in Northeast China, and was appointed Acting Governor and Deputy Party secretary of the province, replacing outgoing governor Chen Zhenggao. He was confirmed by the provincial legislature as Governor later that year and served as governor until May 8, 2015. On May 4, 2015, he succeeded Wang Min as Communist Party Secretary of Liaoning, becoming first-in-charge of the province.

At the 19th Party Congress, Li Xi was named a member of the Politburo of the Chinese Communist Party. On October 28, 2017, shortly after the party congress, Li was transferred to take over the politically important southern province of Guangdong from Hu Chunhua as provincial party secretary. Following his ascension to the Politburo Standing Committee, Li was succeeded by Huang Kunming on October 28, 2022, as the Party Secretary of Guangdong.

In October 2022, following the first plenary session of the 20th CPC Central Committee, Li was appointed to the 20th Politburo Standing Committee of the Chinese Communist Party. Li is considered a confidante of Xi Jinping.

Li was an alternate member of the 17th and the 18th Central Committees of the Chinese Communist Party, served as a full member of the 19th Central Committee of the Chinese Communist Party, and currently serves as a full member of the 20th Central Committee of the Chinese Communist Party.

References 

1956 births
Living people
Governors of Liaoning
Chinese Communist Party politicians from Gansu
People's Republic of China politicians from Gansu
Political office-holders in Gansu
Political office-holders in Shaanxi
Political office-holders in Shanghai
People from Longnan
Alternate members of the 17th Central Committee of the Chinese Communist Party
Alternate members of the 18th Central Committee of the Chinese Communist Party
Members of the 19th Politburo of the Chinese Communist Party
Members of the 20th Politburo Standing Committee of the Chinese Communist Party
Delegates to the 12th National People's Congress
Delegates to the 10th National People's Congress